Margarita Hernández (born 3 December 1985) is a Mexican long distance runner who specialises in the marathon. She competed in the women's marathon event at the 2016 Summer Olympics.

References

External links
 

1985 births
Living people
Mexican female long-distance runners
Mexican female marathon runners
Athletes (track and field) at the 2016 Summer Olympics
Olympic athletes of Mexico
Central American and Caribbean Games gold medalists for Mexico
Competitors at the 2014 Central American and Caribbean Games
People from Toluca
Central American and Caribbean Games medalists in athletics
21st-century Mexican women